The Lugano degli Angioli funicular was a funicular railway and inclined lift in the city of Lugano in the Swiss canton of Ticino. It linked a lower terminus near the lakeside and the church of Santa Maria degli Angioli with an upper terminus adjacent to the Hotel Bristol. The upper station was on the third floor of a tower, linked with a footbridge to the hotel. The line had a single track and single car, which was balanced by a vertically operating counterweight in the tower.

It was of  gauge. The single car had 4 compartments and a maximum capacity of 26 passengers.

The line opened in 1913. In 1973 it was gifted by its owner to the City of Lugano. The Hotel Bristol closed in 1981, and the funicular followed in 1986. The line remains in existence, in an abandoned state. In 2012 the line was listed as a cultural property of regional significance. In April 2018 the Lugano city authorities announced a competition, with a CHF36,000 prize, for the best idea for a future for the funicular. In September of the same year, the same authorities requested a loan of CHF325,000 for a study into the future of the funicular and how it could form part of a wider plan for improved access to the lake. It is estimated that restoration as a static monument would cost CHF2.6 million, and a return to operation would cost CHF5.5 million.

See also 
 List of funicular railways
 List of funiculars in Switzerland

References 

Closed railway lines in Switzerland
Funicular railways in Switzerland
Inclined elevators
Metre gauge railways in Switzerland
Railway lines closed in 1986
Railway lines opened in 1913
Transport in Lugano